The 1851 Atlantic hurricane season was the first Atlantic hurricane season to be included in the official Atlantic tropical cyclone record. Six known tropical cyclones occurred during the season, the earliest of which formed on June 25 and the latest of which dissipated on October 19. These dates fall within the range of most Atlantic tropical cyclone activity. None of the cyclones existed simultaneously with another. Of the six storms, three only have a single point in their track known.

Two other hurricanes were reported during the season, one near Tampico and the other near Jamaica; however, they are not in the official hurricane database. There may have been other unconfirmed tropical cyclones during the season. Meteorologist Christopher Landsea estimates that between zero and six storms were missed from the official database, due to small tropical cyclone size, sparse ship reports, and relatively unpopulated coastlines.



Season summary 
The first struck Texas as a hurricane, which caused moderate to heavy damage, particularly to shipping in Matagorda Bay. One death was indirectly related to the hurricane, as well as at least two injuries.

The strongest and deadliest hurricane of the season tracked from east of the Lesser Antilles, through the Greater Antilles, and across the southeastern United States before last being observed near Newfoundland; it was tied for having the longest duration for a hurricane prior to 1870. Many houses were destroyed along its path, primarily along the Florida Panhandle.

The other landfalling hurricane was one that struck near Tampico, where it caused heavy damage. The last tropical storm of the season made landfall on Rhode Island, though associated damage is unknown. A tropical storm affected the Lesser Antilles in early July, and another tropical storm remained nearly stationary for three days to the southeast of North Carolina.

Timeline

Systems

Hurricane One 

It tracked westward, moving ashore near Matagorda Bay later that night near peak intensity, with an estimated minimum barometric central pressure of 977 mbar; due to lack of observations, it is possible the hurricane struck as the equivalent of a Category 2 hurricane on the Saffir–Simpson scale. The cyclone slowly weakened as it turned northwestward, with hurricane-force wind gusts reported 24 hours after landfall in current-day Medina County. It is estimated that the storm dissipated early on June 28 over central Texas.

The hurricane produced heavy damage near where it moved ashore, having been described as the most disastrous experienced there to date. The winds destroyed every wharf and several houses in Port Lavaca. On Matagorda Island, the saltwater contaminated the fresh water supply, and in Matagorda Bay, heavy shipping losses were reported. A fort near current day Laredo reported  of precipitation. Across its path, the winds downed several trees and houses, leaving two people injured and contributing to a death when a sick person was exposed to the storm.

Hurricane Two 

A moderate hurricane made landfall near Tampico, which was described as having moved ashore before July 7; the Hurricane Research Division assessed the date as July 5. Heavy damage was reported in Tampico.

Tropical Storm Three 

A tropical storm passed through the southern Lesser Antilles on July 10. Overall documentation on the storm was weak, and its track elsewhere is unknown.

Hurricane Four 

It tracked west-northwestward, attaining hurricane status on August 17 as it approached the Lesser Antilles. Shortly thereafter, the hurricane passed between Antigua and Saint Kitts and later south of Saint Croix. On August 18 it brushed the southern coast of Puerto Rico, though it affected the entire island due to a large size of the storm. The next day it made landfall on the southern coast of the Dominican Republic. The cyclone rapidly weakened to tropical storm status over Hispaniola, though it regained hurricane status as it paralleled the southern coast of Cuba just offshore. Late on August 20, the cyclone crossed western Cuba, briefly weakening to tropical storm status before again regaining hurricane status in the southeastern Gulf of Mexico. Turning northeastward, the hurricane moved ashore near Panama City, Florida at peak intensity, with an estimated barometric pressure of 960 mbar. It accelerated across the Southeastern United States, weakening to a tropical storm before exiting North Carolina into the Atlantic Ocean on August 25. On August 27, it was last observed over Newfoundland as a weak tropical storm.

The hurricane passed near Saint Lucia on August 17, where high tides and rough seas were reported. Flooding was reported in northern Puerto Rico during its passage. Impact is unknown in Hispaniola and Cuba. Rough seas destroyed a brig, killing 17 people, and another person drowned due to a shipwreck. Many ships were expected to have been lost in the storm, resulting in fear of potentially hundreds of deaths. The storm caused heavy damage along the coastline, and in Apalachicola the winds destroyed the roofs of all but two or three buildings. Dog Island Light was destroyed, resulting in five deaths. Further inland, many houses were blown over in Tallahassee, totaling $60,000 in damage (1851 USD). Heavy damage was reported in Alabama, including destroyed crops and damaged houses; damage in the state was less than in Florida. Hurricane-force winds extended into southwestern Georgia, while tropical storm force winds were reported along the coastline. In Savannah, the winds damaged many houses and downed many trees. In North Carolina and Virginia, winds from the storm destroyed crop fields and small buildings; in the region, it was described as the worst storm in 30 years. Storm damage was reported as far north as Cambridge, Massachusetts.

Tropical Storm Five 

Another ship on September 16 reported similar winds in the same location; Thus, it was estimated to have remained nearly stationary for three days. Its complete track is unknown.

Tropical Storm Six 

It tracked northeastward, gradually strengthening to attain peak winds of  early on October 17. On October 18, the storm turned more to the north-northeast as its forward motion increased. Gradually weakening, the storm dissipated late on October 19 after making landfall on Rhode Island.

Other systems 
On August 2, a hurricane was reported in the vicinity of Tampico. However, it was not listed as a tropical cyclone in the official hurricane database.

An assessment by scholar Michael Chenoweth indicated the presence of a hurricane in the vicinity of western Jamaica around November 7. It is not currently listed in the official hurricane database.

See also 

 Atlantic hurricane season
 List of Atlantic hurricanes

References 

 
1851 meteorology
Articles which contain graphical timelines
Hurricanes